The following is a list of West Bromwich Albion managers from the founding of West Bromwich Albion F.C. in 1878 until the present. It includes both those who have been in permanent charge as well as caretaker managers.

All managers prior to 1948 were given the title secretary-manager, and dates for appointment of these should be taken only as approximate, although the years should be correct. The first secretary-manager was Louis Ford in 1890. Fred Everiss served as Albion's secretary-manager during 1902–1948, his 46 years in the post constituting a league record. A high turnover of managers at the club since then has meant that no-one has come close to this length of service, with 28 full-time managers having been appointed in the period 1948–2006.

The full-time post of manager was created in 1948, with Jack Smith the first to take up the position. Albion's longest serving full-time manager was Vic Buckingham, who led the club for six years and in 1953–54 guided the club to victory in the FA Cup and a runners-up spot in the league.

From the 2009–10 season the title of manager was changed to head coach.

Managers and head coaches
Only competitive matches are counted. As of 29 January 2022.

Footnotes

References
 Manager History for West Bromwich Albion at Soccerbase.com

External links
West Bromwich Albion's official website

Managers
 
West Bromwich Albion F.C.